"One Night in Ibiza" is a song by Swiss DJ and producer Mike Candys and singer-songwriter Evelyn. It features rapper Patrick Miller.

Track listing
CD single - Switzerland (2011)
 "One Night In Ibiza" (Extended Mix) - 4:33	
 "One Night In Ibiza" (Radio Mix) - 2:49

Chart performance

Weekly charts

Year-end charts

References 

2011 songs
2011 singles